The moustached warbler (Acrocephalus melanopogon) is an Old World warbler in the genus Acrocephalus. It breeds in southern Europe and southern temperate Asia with a few breeding in north-west Africa. It is partially migratory. South-west European birds are resident, south-east European birds winter in the Mediterranean breeding range, and the Asiatic race migrates to Arabia, India and Pakistan.

It is scarce north of its range, but has occurred as a very rare vagrant as far as Poland and Denmark. There have been a few reports from Great Britain, including a pair breeding in Cambridgeshire in 1946, but these records have recently been removed from the official list of British birds, being unconvincingly distinguished from sedge warblers or paddyfield warblers.

This passerine bird is a species found in upright aquatic vegetation such as reeds and sedge. 3 to 6 eggs are laid from mid-April and incubated for 14 to 15 days. The nest is built over water among reeds or rushes or in a bush. This species is usually monogamous (Leisler & Wink 2000).

The adult has a finely streaked brown back and white underparts. The forehead is flattened, there is a prominent whitish supercilium, grey ear coverts, and the bill is strong and pointed.

The sexes are identical, as with most warblers, but young birds are more heavily streaked and have markings on the breast. Like most warblers, it is insectivorous and also feeds on water snails.

The song is fast and similar to the sedge warbler and reed warbler, with some mimicry and typically acrocephaline whistles added. Its song is softer and more melodious than those of its relatives, and includes phrases reminiscent of the nightingale. Unlike the sedge warbler, it does not sing in flight.

References 

Leisler, B. & Wink, Michael (2000): Frequencies of multiple paternity in three Acrocephalus species (Aves: Sylviidae) with different mating systems (A. palustris, A. arundinaceus, A. paludicola). Ethology, Ecology & Evolution 12: 237–249. PDF fulltext
Snow, David W.; Perrins, Christopher M.; Doherty, Paul & Cramp, Stanley (1998): The complete birds of the western Palaearctic on CD-ROM. Oxford University Press.

External links

Ageing and sexing (PDF; 1.9 MB) by Javier Blasco-Zumeta & Gerd-Michael Heinze

moustached warbler
Birds of Europe
Birds of North Africa
Birds of Central Asia
Birds of Western Asia
Birds of Armenia
Birds of Azerbaijan
moustached warbler